50 Records was a Minneapolis-based record label that was co-founded in 2006 by Drew Pearson, Dylan Ohm, and CEO Deb Ward-Ingstad, who also owns several radio stations in the South. Artists on their roster include White Light Riot and Elevation. Both bands charted nationally on all three charts at specialty radio and received high rotation on college radio.

Activities
50 Records partnered with Zude to host an event at the 2008 SXSW music festival in Austin, Texas.

50 Records/50 Entertainment were a major contributor in organizing the 10,000 Lakes Festival in 2008, primarily in relation to the related Cosmic Break Tour.

Releases for 2008 include a full-length album from Elevation, released in August by 50 Records/Sony RED.

50 Records album releases have been in collaboration with such people as engineer Adam Ayan (The Rolling Stones, Nirvana), producer Mark Endert (Madonna, Maroon 5), engineer Bob Ludwig, and Dan Hannon (Manchester Orchestra).

Artists represented by 50 Records have received favorable reviews and featured stories from the New York Post, National Public Radio and almost every news and arts publication local to Minnesota.

50 Records produced a charitable compilation album for Faith's Lodge called Hope Rocks. Faith's Lodge has received national recognition through The Today Show and local Minneapolis support from WCCO-TV.

See also
 List of record labels

External links
 Corporate site
 MySpace page
 Official WLR Digital Press Kit

References

Record labels established in 2006
American independent record labels
Independent record labels based in Minnesota
Rock record labels
Indie rock record labels
Alternative rock record labels
Pop record labels
Companies based in Minneapolis